Šukioniai is a village in the southwest of Pakruojis District Municipality, Lithuania.

A hill fort at the location was destroyed by an attack of the Livonian Order in August 1372.

Jonas Noreika, an anti-Soviet partisan accused of collaborating in the Holocaust, was born in the village in 1910. The village school is named after Noreika.

References

Villages in Šiauliai County
Pakruojis District Municipality